Pischke is a surname. Notable people with the surname include:

Garth Pischke (born 1955), Canadian volleyball coach
Taylor Pischke (born 1993), Canadian volleyball player
Tom Pischke (born 1982), American politician